"A City on Fire" is a song by English post-hardcore band Fightstar, released 20 December 2009, on Search and Destroy Records as a digital download only.

The single is featured on the deluxe edition re-release of the band's third album, Be Human, which includes four recorded tracks.

Digital bundle

 "A City on Fire" - 3:11
 "Vincent" (Don McLean cover) - 4:01

Music video 

A music video was filmed for the single in October 2009, and premiered on the bands MySpace on 24 October. The video was directed by Sitcom Soldiers.

The video depicts the band performing in a studio in front of a brightly lit display screen. There are also various shots of London sped up, and various political messages on billboards.

Chart positions

Personnel
 Charlie Simpson — lead vocals, rhythm guitar
 Alex Westaway — lead guitar, vocals
 Dan Haigh – bass guitar
 Omar Abidi – drums, percussion

References

External links
 Official Video on YouTube.

Songs about cities
Fightstar songs
2009 singles
Songs written by Charlie Simpson
Songs written by Alex Westaway
2009 songs